Glorious is the debut studio album by English singer and songwriter Foxes, originally due for release on 28 February 2014, but was pushed back to 12 May 2014, in favour of releasing the album simultaneously worldwide. The album is available in three versions: the standard album, a deluxe version and a limited edition vinyl.

Background and release
After a spate of successful songs, appearing as a "featured" artist alongside Zedd, Fall Out Boy, Sub Focus and Rudimental as well as a successful single in "Youth", Foxes (Allen) showed intent at releasing a full album to steer away from the "featured artist" title. In an interview with Billboard, she stated the reason was "[...]Because I also have my music that's my baby."
In an interview during the "Making of the Album" video featured on her VEVO page on YouTube, Allen calls the album "extremely personal", as well that its influence is from her childhood as well as growing up. She also claims the album is "me talking to myself", as music to her is a "form of therapy".

From the same video, Allen described her process for making the songs, in which she stated "I feel like the song already exists" and "I start with a big white piece of paper and I'll just write things I'm feeling[...]It kind of comes out of nowhere."

The track list features several new songs, as well as two songs featured on her first EP Warrior (2012) ("In Her Arms" and "White Coats").

The album was released on 12 May 2014, in both digital and physical formats. It has sold 83,009 copies to date in UK.

Promotion
Although not classed as part of the promotion to the run up to Glorious, "Holding onto Heaven" was made available for free on iTunes during the month of December 2013.

On 17 April 2014, Amazon Artist Lounge - EP was released to download from Amazon for free. It contains live versions of "Let Go for Tonight", "Youth" and "Holding onto Heaven".

Tour
Foxes embarked on a 16-date tour in England, Scotland and Ireland, which started 24 February 2014 and ended on 24 May 2014.

Singles
"Youth" was released as the album's lead single on 6 September 2013. The song reached number 12 on the UK Singles Chart.

"Let Go for Tonight" was released as the album's second single on 23 February 2014. The song entered the UK Singles Chart at number 7, becoming her highest-peaking single and first top 10 single.

"Holding onto Heaven" was released as the album's third single on 4 May 2014. It debuted on the UK Singles Chart at number 14.

"Glorious" was confirmed to be the album's fourth single by Foxes, and it was released on 12 August 2014.

Promotional singles
If Glorious was pre-ordered on iTunes, "Shaking Heads" was available to download alongside the pre-order of the album.

The live version of "Clarity" was made available to download for free on the Amazon MP3 store.

Critical reception

Glorious received generally favourable reviews upon release. At Metacritic, which assigns a normalized rating out of 100 to reviews from mainstream publications, it received an average score of 61, based on 8 reviews. Rob Knaggs from Clash remarked that "Foxes has made a pop album that, despite occasionally drifting into melodrama, serves as an enjoyable listen stuffed with genuine pop-gems, sun-baked choruses and enough bite to warrant repeated listens." Writing for The Guardian, Paul MacInnes noted that "while the lyrics are too cloying and cliched to mean much, in conjunction with such a button-pushing soundtrack, they still carry the capacity to move." Laurence Day from The Line of Best Fit praised "Let Go for Tonight" for having "literally everything you want in massive single – the chorus, the hooks, the singalongability" and noted that Foxes "tends to deal with matters similar to Icona Pop", particularly those that are "centred around being youthful, frivolous and socially clumsy". In a review for AllMusic, Fred Thomas said that "while the infectiousness of singles like 'Youth' and 'Let Go for Tonight' is undeniable, so often artists like Foxes can't quite rise to the challenge of filling out an entire album's worth of solid material around a few hits" although also stating that "the album on the whole is wrapped in a unique atmosphere that somehow manages to be both darkly moody and carefree." Writing for Digital Spy, Lewis Corner commended the album, saying that it "strives to be celestial, booming and chart-worthy - and for the majority, it hits that mark" further noting "Let Go for Tonight" as the standout track "[resulting] in a magnificent centerpiece for Glorious; a stellar debut album that deserves to make Foxes a household name once and for all." Shefali Srivastava from DIY praised the "huge, stunning chorus" of the album's title track as well as stating, "dark and light, sweet yet savvy, layered but not overproduced – Foxes has created a work that embodies all these dichotomies and walks the line between them perfectly. It really is glorious."

Holly Williams was less enthusiastic in her review for The Independent, stating that "there are fun dance tracks, but few real earworms" and further commenting that Glorious "adds up to a shallowly appealing, summery package; glossily produced and personality free." Killian Fox of The Observer noted that "though the album is formulaic and polished, there is enough crackle in its dark, lustrous soundscapes and tales of nocturnal romance to intrigue – and Allen's voice has the power to match those booming drums." Alex Denney from NME noted similarities between "Youth" and "Talking to Ghosts" to the music of Bat for Lashes as well as comparing "Let Go for Tonight" to Bonnie Tyler's "Holding Out for a Hero" and concluded the review stating that "Glorious is no failure". Writing for Financial Times, Ludovic Hunter-Tilney pointed out that Glorious is "designed for maximum exposure" and is "a big-screen production."

Track listing

Notes
 signifies an additional producer

Sample credits
 "Talking to Ghosts" samples "Dr. Mabuse" performed by Propaganda and produced by Trevor Horn.

Personnel
Credits for Glorious adapted from AllMusic.

Louisa Allen – primary artist, composer
Iyiola Babalola – percussion, programming
Tony Cousins – mastering
Ralf Dörper – composer
Steve Fitzmaurice – mixing, programming
Future Cut – additional production
Toby Gad – composer
Ghostwriter – additional production, mixing, producer, programming
Jonny Harris – bass, composer, drum programming, drums, instrumentation, piano, programming, synthesizer, background vocals
Darren Heelis – bass guitar, Korg synthesizer, mixing assistant, programming
Liz Horsman – assistant, programming
Liam Howe – composer, engineer, mixing, producer
Tom Hull – composer

Sam Kennedy – piano
Darren Lewis – piano, programming
Ben Mark – composer
Paul McLean – cover photo
Michael Mertens – composer
Chad Pickard – cover photo
Ben Preston – additional production
Jarrad Rogers – bass, composer, drums, engineer, guitar, piano, producer, programming, Wurlitzer
Jamie Snell – engineer
Mike Spencer – additional production, bass, drums, bass guitar, keyboards, mixing, producer
Andreas Thein – composer
Matt Wiggins – Additional production
Tim Young – mastering

Charts and certifications

Weekly charts

Certifications

Release history

References

2014 debut albums
Foxes (singer) albums
Sony Records albums